Georg Ackermann may refer to:

 Georg Ackermann (athlete) (born 1972), retired German long jumper
 Georg Ackermann (pilot) (1918–2007), German Luftwaffe bomber pilot
 Georg Christian Benedict Ackermann (1763–1833), German theologian
 Georg Friedrich Ackermann (1780–1853), German landscape painter

See also
 George W. Ackerman (1884–1962), American government photographer
Ackermann (surname)